In Old English law, a Bowbearer was an under-officer of the forest who looked after all manner of trespass on vert or venison, and who attached, or caused to be attached, the offenders, in the feudal Court of Attachment.

The bow was a renowned English weapon, made of wood from the yew tree.

Examples of the role

The best-documented example of Bowbearers in England is to be found in the Forest of Bowland in north-eastern Lancashire.

In the late twelfth century, Oughtred de Bolton, son of Edwin de Bolton ("Edwinus Comes de Boelton" in the Domesday Book) is described as an early Bowbearer in the royal forests of Bowland and Gilsland, at the time of Henry II.  However, this account is flawed as the possibility of Oughtred being the son of Edwin is fanciful and cannot be substantiated.  It would have been impossible for Oughtred to have been Bowbearer of Gilsland before the 1170s when the barony was first brought into the Norman realm.  Prior to that, it had formed part of the kingdom of the Scots .

Bowbearers and Master Foresters of Bowland

After the early fourteenth century, it is often difficult to distinguish between Bowbearers and Master Foresters in the Bowland record:

Bowbearers of Bowland (1150–1304)

 1157		        Uchtred de Bolton
 1212		        Elias de Bolton
 1220		        Richard de Bolton
 1260		        John de Bolton
 1300		        Edward de Acre
 1304		        Richard de Spaldington

Master Foresters and Bowbearers of Bowland (1304–1650)

 1304–1311	John de Bolton
 1311–1322	Thurstan de Norleygh
 1322–1327	Edmund Dacre
 1327–1330	Richard de Spaldyngton
 1331–1353	Adam de Urswyk
 1353–1372	John de Radcliffe
 1372–1403	Sir Walter Urswyk
 1403–1424	Sir Henry Hoghton
 1424–1425	Sir Thomas Hoghton
 1425–1432	Sir Thomas Tunstall
 1432–1437	Sir William Assheton
 1437–1459	Richard, Earl of  Salisbury
 1459–1471	Sir Richard Tunstall
 1471–1485	Richard, Duke of Gloucester
 1485–1485	Sir James Harrington
 1485–1519	Sir Edward Stanley, later Lord Monteagle
 1519–1526	Sir Richard Tempest
 1526–1543	Sir Thomas Clifford (Bowbearer Sir Nicholas Tempest, executed 1537)
 1543–1553	Sir Arthur D’Arcy
 1554–1554	Sir Thomas Talbot
 1554–1594	Sir Richard Shireburn of Stonyhurst
 1594–1630	Sir Richard Hoghton
 1631–1642	Sir Gilbert Hoghton
 1645–1650	Sir Richard Hoghton

Bowbearers of Bowland after 1660

 1662–1682      	Thomas Parker
 1682–1689     	Curwen Rawlinson
 1689–1706	        Thomas Lister of Westby
 1689–1721      	Edward Parker
 1707–1745      	Thomas Lister of Westby, son of above
 1721–1754      	John Parker
 1745–1757      	John Fenwick of Burrow Hall, Lord of Claughton
 1754–1794      	Edward Parker
 1794–1797      	John Parker
 1797–1820             Thomas Lister Parker (claimed until 1858)
 1820–1832             Thomas Parker of Alkincoats
 1835–1871             Richard Eastwood 
 1871–2010             No Bowbearers appointed
 2010–		        Robert Redmayne Parker

Perhaps the most notorious Bowbearer of the Forest of Bowland was Sir Nicholas Tempest, who was executed at Tyburn in 1537. Tempest was one of the northern leaders of the Pilgrimage of Grace, the Catholic uprising against Henry VIII and was linked to Sawley Abbey.

Parker family

The Parker family were the Bowbearers of the Forest of Bowland from the time of the English Restoration in 1660. The family likes to claim the office traces back as far as Robert Parker in the early 16th century but this is difficult to substantiate given the available evidence.  In reality, while the family did have Bowbearers over many generations between the seventeenth and nineteenth centuries, the office was always granted to them by their local lord, the Lord of Bowland, the so-called Lord of the Fells.

The Parker hereditary claim appears to have been concocted in the early part of the nineteenth century by Thomas Lister Parker, a socially ambitious individual who wished to make a mark in London society. Thomas Lister Parker eventually bankrupted himself due to his various extravagances but not before he had corrupted the historical record.  Both Whitaker's and Baines' accounts of the history of Bowland bear witness to that corruption. The last known Bowbearer of the Forest of Bowland was Richard Eastwood of Thorneyholme, an acclaimed breeder of racehorses and shorthorn cattle and land agent to John Towneley, 13th Lord of Bowland. Eastwood died in 1871 and is buried at St Hubert's, Dunsop Bridge.

Although the Lord of Bowland's courts at Whitewell that appointed the Bowbearers fell into disuse in the first half of the nineteenth century, it was reported in April 2010 that William Bowland, 16th Lord of Bowland had re-asserted his ancient right and appointed Robert Redmayne Parker of Browsholme Hall his Bowbearer of the Forest of Bowland, the first Parker to be so appointed in more than 150 years.

In 2011, Robert Parker led a party of dignitaries from the Bowland Higher Division Parish Council, the Forest authorities, and local community, to welcome the 16th Lord of Bowland to Dunsop Bridge on his first official visit to the Forest. In October 2012, Robert Parker was formally presented with his Bowbearer's "wand of office" by the 16th Lord of Bowland at a public ceremony in Slaidburn. This ceremony marked the 90th anniversary of the final meeting of the manorial court at the town's Tudor courthouse.

Other English Bowbearers

Other notable examples of Bowbearers in England include those appointed in the Forests of Delamere, Hatfield, and Mashamshire.

In 1513, a Richard Done of Utkington is described as the hereditary Bowbearer of Delamere.

In 1605, Sir Robert Swift of Streetthorpe (Edenthorpe) was appointed Bowbearer to the Royal Chase of Hatfield by James I. A local tradition in that area states that the many yew trees of the region were planted as a result, to provide wood for bows. The Complete Shakespeare Encyclopedia by Carol Enos also states that "Alvanley Hall, the property of William Arden, Baron Alvanley, has been abandoned as the residence of the family for nearly a century and a half, and little of the house remains.  Lord Alvanley is hereditary Bowbearer of the Forest of Delamere, and possesses the ancient bugle horn by which his ancestors have held that office almost from the period of the Norman Invasion” (Chetham Society, Vol I, 331)." 

In 1632, Sir Francis Armitage of Kirklees, was appointed Bowbearer of the Free Chase of Mashamshire.

Other uses

The bowbearer is not a uniquely English phenomenon.  There was an officer to the king, described as a "bowbearer", in ancient Persia. The officers in most close attendance on the monarch's person were, in war, his charioteer, his stoolbearer, his bowbearer, and his quiverbearer; in peace, his parasolbearer, and his fanbearer, who was also privileged to carry what has been termed "the royal pocket-handkerchief".

References

Attribution

Historical legal occupations
Law enforcement occupations in the United Kingdom
Ceremonial officers in England